Tomoa Narasaki (楢﨑 智亜 Narasaki Tomoa, born June 22, 1996) is a Japanese professional sport climber and boulderer.

He started climbing at age 10, together with Sachi Amma, in Sachi's family climbing gym. Previously, he had been training apparatus gymnastics. In 2016 and 2019, he won both the Bouldering World Championship and the overall title at the Bouldering World Cup. His younger brother Meichi Narasaki is also a prominent professional climber.

In 2019, Narasaki qualified for the Tokyo 2020 Olympics by winning gold in the IFSC Climbing World Championships. He placed fourth in the Olympic combined event.

Narasaki formerly held the Japanese record for speed climbing with a time of 5.73 seconds, which he secured in March 2021 at the Climbing Japan Cup speed competition. He is credited with devising the "Tomoa skip", a novel speed climbing method to bypass one of the lower holds in the speed climbing wall.

Rankings

Climbing World Cup

Climbing World Championships

World Cup podiums

Lead

Bouldering

Notable Ascents
On December 1, 2019, Narasaki became the sixth climber to flash a V14 boulder after sending Decided in Mizugaki, Japan, on his first attempt. In 2021, Narasaki sent Asagimadara (V15) on his third attempt.

Personal life
On December 25, 2021, Narasaki and fellow Japanese sport climber Akiyo Noguchi announced their marriage on their respective social media pages.

See also
List of grade milestones in rock climbing
History of rock climbing
Rankings of most career IFSC gold medals

References

External links 

 Tomoa Narasaki's profile on Adidas-rockstars.com
 Tomoa Narasaki's profile on Fiveten.com

Japanese rock climbers
Living people
1996 births
Asian Games medalists in sport climbing
Sport climbers at the 2018 Asian Games
Asian Games bronze medalists for Japan
Medalists at the 2018 Asian Games
Competitors at the 2017 World Games
Sport climbers at the 2020 Summer Olympics
Olympic sport climbers of Japan
IFSC Climbing World Championships medalists
IFSC Climbing World Cup overall medalists
Boulder climbers